Do Rizgan (also Romanized as Do Rīzgān; also known as Darbar Kūn, Dūrbozgān, and Dūrbozkān) is a village in Rak Rural District, in the Central District of Kohgiluyeh County, Kohgiluyeh and Boyer-Ahmad Province, Iran. At the 2006 census, its population was 261, in 54 families.

References 

Populated places in Kohgiluyeh County